These are the late night schedules for the four United States broadcast networks that offer programming during this time period, from September 2014 to August 2015. All times are Eastern or Pacific. Affiliates will fill non-network schedule with local, syndicated, or paid programming. Affiliates also have the option to preempt or delay network programming at their discretion.

Legend

Schedule

Monday-Friday

Notes
 The final episode of The Late Late Show with Craig Ferguson aired on December 19, 2014. From January 5, 2015 to March 6, 2015, guest hosts filled the void until The Late Late Show with James Corden premiered on March 23, 2015.
 The Summer 2014 weekday schedule continued into the Fall 2014 scheduled unchanged.
 On CBS, special late-night editions of The Talk aired January 12–16, 2015 in the timeslot of The Late Late Show.
 Following the series finale of Late Show with David Letterman, its timeslot was filled with varying reruns of CBS drama programs under the umbrella title CBS Summer Showcase until the premiere of The Late Show with Stephen Colbert in September 2015. The Mentalist was the first to be aired in this slot.

Saturday

By network

ABC

Returning series
ABC World News Now
Jimmy Kimmel Live!
Nightline

CBS

Returning series
Late Night with David Letterman
The Late Late Show with Craig Ferguson
Up to the Minute

New series
CBS Summer Showcase
The Late Late Show with James Corden

FOX

Returning series:
Encore Programming

Not returning from 2013-14:
Animation Domination High-Def

NBC

Returning series
Last Call with Carson Daly
Late Night with Seth Meyers
Mad Money 
Saturday Night Live
Today With Kathie Lee and Hoda 
The Tonight Show Starring Jimmy Fallon

Not returning from 2013-14:
Late Night with Jimmy Fallon
The Tonight Show with Jay Leno

References

United States late night network television schedules
Late
Late